Hitikau is a volcanic mountain of Ua Huka, in the Marquesas Islands of Polynesia.

Auberge Hitikau
There is a small hostel and restaurant at the foot of the mountain in the village of Auberge Hitikau, named after the mountain. It contains four double rooms, with an eatery noted for its goat and pork dishes and kaveka omelettes.

References

Landforms of the Marquesas Islands
Mountains of French Polynesia
Ua Huka